Duje Draganja (born 27 February 1983) is a retired Croatian swimmer who won the silver medal in men's 50 metres freestyle race at the 2004 Summer Olympics in Athens, Greece.

Career
Draganja won a silver medal in 2005 World Aquatics Championships held in Montreal in 50 m freestyle. He has 4 medals from World Short Course Swimming Championships. In 2006 and 2008 he won a gold medal in 50 meter freestyle. Also he has bronze medal in 100 m freestyle (2008) and bronze medal in 50 m butterfly (2006).

Draganja is also a former NCAA record holder in the 100 yard freestyle, with a time of 41.49, set in 2005, while he swam for the University of California, Berkeley. He, like many other world-class, non-American swimmers, chose to spend 4 years training and competing at an American university. During his four years with Cal, Duje won 10 Pac-10 swimming titles, and eight NCAA National championships. While at Cal, he trained with the world-renowned sprinting coach Mike Bottom. Bottom coached Draganja for seven years before they parted ways following the 2008 Olympics. Now Draganja trains in Zagreb with swimming club Dubrava.

Draganja trained at The Race Club, a swimming club founded by Olympic Swimmers Gary Hall, Jr. and his father, Gary Hall, Sr. The Race Club, originally known as "The World Team," was designed to serve as a training group for elite swimmers across the world in preparation for the 2000 Sydney Olympic Games. To be able to train with the Race Club, one must either have been ranked in the top 20 in the world the past 3 calendar years or top 3 in their nation in the past year. The Race Club included such well known swimmers as Roland Mark Schoeman, Mark Foster, Ryk Neethling, Ricardo Busquets and Therese Alshammar. They were coached by University of Michigan coach Mike Bottom.

He has been controversial in Croatia for his decision to take the citizenship of Qatar and continue his swimming career under the flag of that country, after receiving a very lucrative offer to do so. Croatian public opinion largely turned against Draganja at that time with the press portraying him as a villain with no respect for his homeland. Draganja accepted a Qatar passport in August 2005 claiming that he will keep his Croatian passport and will not change his religion. Draganja was raised Roman Catholic.

However, in February 2006, the swimmer made it clear that he had reversed his decision and that he will continue to compete for his country of birth, Croatia.

Personal bests

Long course
50 meters freestyle – 21.29 NR (Rome, 31 July 2009)
100 meters freestyle – 48.18 NR (Rome, 29 July 2009)
50 meters butterfly – 23.03 NR (Rome, 26 July 2009)
100 meters butterfly – 52.46 (Athens, 20 August 2004)

Short course
50 meters freestyle – 20.70 NR (Istanbul, 10 December 2009)
100 meters freestyle – 46.64 NR (March 2004)
100 meters butterfly – 51.19 (Debrecen, 13 December 2007)
100 metres medley – 51.20 NR (Istanbul, 13 December 2009)

Olympic results

See also
 World record progression 50 metres freestyle

References

External links
Profile at CalBears.com
Profile at PK Dubrava website 
Profile at the Croatian Swimming Federation website 
 Duje Draganja: Cal swimmer a national hero in Croatia
 Croatian swimmer Draganja to swim for Qatar
 Cash lures from Qatar may lead to rewriting of rulebook
  Duje Draganja srebrni!
 Draganja U-turn
 2007 Q & A with Duje Draganja

1983 births
Living people
Male butterfly swimmers
Croatian male swimmers
Croatian male freestyle swimmers
Swimmers at the 2000 Summer Olympics
Swimmers at the 2004 Summer Olympics
Swimmers at the 2008 Summer Olympics
Olympic silver medalists for Croatia
Olympic swimmers of Croatia
Sportspeople from Split, Croatia
World record setters in swimming
World Aquatics Championships medalists in swimming
Medalists at the FINA World Swimming Championships (25 m)
European Aquatics Championships medalists in swimming
Medalists at the 2004 Summer Olympics
Olympic silver medalists in swimming
California Golden Bears men's swimmers